Vasily Ivanovich Kuznetsov (Russian: Василий Иванович Кузнецов;  – 20 June 1964) was a Soviet general and a Hero of the Soviet Union.

Life and career
Kuznetsov was born to a working-class family in Ust-Usolka, Solikamsky Uyezd, Perm Governorate. In April 1915 he was drafted into the Imperial Russian Army, taking part in World War I. In March 1916 he completed officer training in Kazan, attaining the rank of a Podporuchik in July. 

In August 1918, after the October Revolution, he joined the Red Army, serving in the Russian Civil War first as a company commander and later as a deputy regimental commander. In October 1923 he was appointed commander of 89th Rifle Regiment. 

He joined the Communist Party in 1928. During 1929 he undertook advanced officers' training, and he graduated from the Frunze Academy in 1936. In October 1936 he became the 99th Rifle Division's commander. In July 1937, he was transferred to head the 16th Rifle Corps.

During September 1939, Komkor Kuznetsov participated in the Invasion of Poland as chief of the Vitebsk and Polotsk Army Groups. On 4 June 1940, with the introduction of new ranks, he became a lieutenant general.

World War 2
On 22 June 1941, Kuznetsov's 3rd Army was stationed in Belarus, as part of the Western Front. It was overwhelmed and surrounded by German forces. In July, he and the remains of his formation broke out and returned to the Soviet lines. This feat earned him praise from Stalin when he issued Order No. 270. In late August, he was sent to command the Southwestern Front's 21st Army, but his force suffered crushing defeat once more in the Battle of Kiev. On October, he was appointed to command the Kharkov Military District, but reassigned to head the 1st Shock Army on 23 November, with which he took part in the Battle of Moscow. His units liberated Klin and Solnechnogorsk.

In February 1942, the Army relocated to the north, taking part in the Demyansk operation. On July, Kuznetsov was given command of the 63rd Army, positioned near Stalingrad. The formation was renamed 1st Guards Army on November. For his conduct in the campaign, Kuznetsov was awarded the Order of Suvorov 1st Class. On 25 March 1943 he was promoted to the rank of Colonel General. The 1st Guards later took part in the battles for the Donbass region and in the Dniepr crossing. On 15 December, Kuznetsov was appointed Bagramyan's deputy in the 1st Baltic Front. In this capacity he participated in the campaigns for Belarus, the Baltics and East Prussia. The Front was disbanded on late February 1945, and Kuznetsov assumed command over the 1st Belorussian's 3rd Shock Army on 16 March.  The Army was involved in the urban fighting inside Berlin; On 30 April, one of its formations, the 150th Rifle Division, stormed the Reichstag. Its soldiers hoisted the Victory Banner atop of the building.

Post-war career
On 29 May 1945, Kuznetsov was awarded the title Hero of the Soviet Union (Medal no. 6460) for his performance. After the war, he remained the 3rd Army's commander in Germany for a while,  then attended the Voroshilov Academy, graduating in 1948. He served as chairman of the Voluntary Society for Cooperation with the Army and later of DOSAAF. From 1953 to 1957, he headed the Volga Military District. Until his retirement in 1960, he served in the Ministry of Defense. Kuznetsov was a deputy in the 2nd and 4th Convocations of the Supreme Soviet. He died in Moscow in 1964.

Honours and awards
Soviet Union

Foreign Awards

References

1894 births
1964 deaths
People from Cherdynsky District
People from Solikamsky Uyezd
Communist Party of the Soviet Union members
Second convocation members of the Soviet of the Union
Fourth convocation members of the Soviet of the Union
Soviet colonel generals
Russian military personnel of World War I
Soviet military personnel of the Russian Civil War
People of the Soviet invasion of Poland
Soviet military personnel of World War II
Frunze Military Academy alumni
Heroes of the Soviet Union
Recipients of the Order of Lenin
Recipients of the Order of the Red Banner
Recipients of the Order of Suvorov, 1st class
Recipients of the Order of Suvorov, 2nd class
Burials at Novodevichy Cemetery
Knights of the Virtuti Militari
Recipients of the Order of the Cross of Grunwald, 3rd class
Commandeurs of the Légion d'honneur